The enzyme glycerol-1,2-cyclic-phosphate 2-phosphodiesterase (EC 3.1.4.42) catalyzes the reaction

glycerol 1,2-cyclic phosphate + H2O  glycerol 1-phosphate

This enzyme belongs to the family of hydrolases, specifically, those acting on phosphoric diester bonds.  The systematic name is rac-glycerol-1,2-cyclic-phosphate 2-glycerophosphohydrolase. This enzyme is also called rac-glycerol 1:2-cyclic phosphate 2-phosphodiesterase.

References

 

EC 3.1.4
Enzymes of unknown structure